The Real Alternative Party (PAR), formerly the Party for the Restructured Antilles until 2016, is a political party in Curaçao. With four seats the party is the second largest party in the Estates of Curaçao, following the 2021 elections. With eight seats, PAR was the largest party in the first Estates of Curaçao, established in 2010 upon the dissolution of the Netherlands Antilles.

Netherlands Antilles
The party was formed in the wake of constitutional referendums held on the islands in the Netherlands Antilles in 1993, when a majority had voted against the dissolution of the Netherlands Antilles.
At the legislative elections in the Netherlands Antilles, 18 January 2002, the party won 20.6% of the popular vote and 4 of the 14 seats in the Curaçao constituency in the 22-seat Estates of Curaçao. Its leader Etiënne Ys became prime minister of the Netherlands Antilles. When the party won five and six seats respectively in the Netherlands Antilles general election in 2006 and 2010 its leader Emily de Jongh-Elhage became the last Prime Minister of the Netherlands Antilles.

In the island council of the island territory of Curaçao the party won five and seven seats respectively. In the last island council the party obtained 8 of the 21 seats. The island council continued as Estates of Curaçao upon the dissolution of the Netherlands Antilles in October 2010.

Curaçao
On the formation of the second Whiteman cabinet in November 2015 the PAR joined the government for the first time in five years. PAR remained part of the government until December 2016.

Election results

References

External links
Official web site

Political parties in Curaçao
Political parties established in 1993
1993 establishments in the Netherlands Antilles